Sticky icky may refer to:
Slang for cannabis
"Sticky Icky", a song from Pitbull's album The Boatlift